Suleiman Mawafaq Al-Salman is a Jordanian footballer who plays for Al-Ramtha SC.

International career
His first match with the Jordan national football team was against Iraq in an international friendly on 16 September 2010 at Amman, which resulted in a 4-1 victory for Jordan.

Honors and Participation in International Tournaments

In AFC Asian Cups 
2011 Asian Cup

In Pan Arab Games 
2011 Pan Arab Games

In WAFF Championships 
2010 WAFF Championship

References

External links 

 

1986 births
Living people
Jordanian footballers
Jordan international footballers
Al-Muharraq SC players
Jordanian expatriate footballers
Expatriate footballers in Bahrain
Expatriate footballers in Saudi Arabia
Jordanian expatriate sportspeople in Bahrain
2011 AFC Asian Cup players
Al-Wehda Club (Mecca) players
Al-Ramtha SC players
Al-Hussein SC (Irbid) players
Al-Faisaly SC players
Ittihad Al-Ramtha players
Association football defenders